This is a list of films produced by the Tollywood (Telugu language film industry) based in Hyderabad in the year 1985.

1985

References 

1985
Telugu
Telugu films